HYY may refer to:
 Student Union of the University of Helsinki
 Happy Yipee Yehey!, a Philippine television program